Edward Gal (born 4 March 1970 in Rheden) is a Dutch dressage rider. He and the stallion Totilas (nicknamed "Toto"), were triple gold medalists at the 2010 FEI World Equestrian Games, becoming the first horse-rider partnership ever to sweep the three available dressage gold medals at a single FEI World Games. Going into the 2010 Games, they had amassed multiple world-record scores in international competition, leading one American journalist to call them "rock stars in the horse world". After the World Equestrian Games, Totilas was sold to German trainer Paul Schockemöhle. Gal continues to be successful training and competing dressage horses at the international level. Despite the success he has been criticised to be harsh trainer who creates stressed and fearful horses.

Career
Gal began his equestrian career as a jumper at age 14, beginning with ponies and graduating to larger horses at age 20. However, when he discovered his horse did not like jumping, he switched to dressage. While enjoying solid success in national and international competition, he did not become a truly dominant rider until he began competing with Totilas in 2008. Gal would later say that he and his team understood that Totilas was a special horse after their first Grand Prix competition.

At the time, Gal replaced his countrywoman Anky van Grunsven as the dominant rider on the world dressage circuit. In July 2009, Gal and Totilas broke van Grunsven's world record score in Grand Prix Freestyle with an 89.50% mark at Hickstead, England, and shortly thereafter followed it up with another record score of 90.75% in the same discipline at that year's European Championships. In December 2009, at the fourth leg of the 2009–10 FEI World Cup Dressage series at Olympia in London, they extended their record in GP Freestyle to 92.30%, more than 10 points above the second-place finisher. While not setting a world record, they easily won that season's FEI World Cup final in GP Freestyle at home in the Netherlands, winning by more than 7 points with a score better than their first world record. The pair also had a world-record score in the Grand Prix Special discipline to their credit, having recorded 86.460% at Aachen in July 2010.

Gal and Totilas were installed as the overwhelming favorites in the 2010 FEI World Games in Lexington, Kentucky, their first competition outside Europe. Klaus Röser, head of the German dressage team that has long dominated the discipline, said about Gal, "That we can beat Edward; I don't think so, I don't believe so. We have to be realistic." Röser's assessment proved correct, with Gal and Toto first leading the Dutch team to gold in the team competition, and then easily winning gold in Grand Prix Special and Grand Prix Freestyle.

In a piece in The Courier-Journal of Louisville, Kentucky that ran before the 2010 Games, dressage trainer Susan Posner pointed out that Totilas was only in his second year in grand prix dressage despite being 10 years old, and said that his success illustrated how capable Gal was as a rider.

He also competed at the 2015 European Dressage Championships in Aachen where he won a gold medal in team dressage. The Dutch national dressage coach Wim Ernes died on 1 November 2016 due to a brain tumor. Gal, together with the other gold medal winners Patrick van der Meer, Hans Peter Minderhoud and Diederik van Silfhout, carried his coffin during the funeral on 5 November 2016.

International Championship results

Notable horses 
 Lingh - 1993 Bay Dutch Warmblood Stallion (Flemmingh x Columbus)
 2003 European Championships - Individual 29th Place
 2004 FEI World Cup Final - Silver Medal
 2005 FEI World Cup Final - Silver Medal
 2005 European Championships - Team Silver Medal, Individual Fourth Place
 2006 FEI World Cup Final - Fourth Place
 2006 World Equestrian Games - Team Silver Medal, Individual 11th Place, Individual 12th Place Freestyle
 IPS Gribaldi - 1993 Black Trakehner Stallion (Kostolany x Ibikus)
 2007 FEI World Cup Final - 11th Place
 Totilas - 2000 Black Dutch Warmblood Stallion (Gribaldi x Glendale)
 2009 European Championships - Team Gold Medal, Individual Silver Medal, Individual Gold Medal Freestyle
 2010 FEI World Cup Final - Gold Medal
 2010 World Equestrian Games - Team Gold Medal, Individual Gold Medal, Individual Gold Medal Freestyle
 Sisther de Jeu - 1999 Bay Dutch Warmblood Mare (Gribaldi x Amor)
 2011 FEI World Cup Final - Fourth Place
 2011 European Championships - Team Bronze Medal, Individual 18th Place
 Glock's Undercover - 2001 Black Dutch Warmblood Gelding (Ferro x Donnerhall)
 2012 London Olympics - Team Bronze Medal, Individual Ninth Place
 2013 FEI World Cup Final - Bronze Medal
 2013 European Championships - Team Silver Medal, Individual Fourth Place, Individual Fourth Place Freestyle
 2014 FEI World Cup Final - Bronze Medal
 2015 FEI World Cup Final - Silver Medal
 2015 European Championships - Team Gold Medal, Individual 29th Place
 Glock's Voice - 2002 Black Dutch Warmblood Stallion (De Niro x Rhodiamant)
 2014 World Equestrian Games - Team Bronze Medal, Individual 25th Place
 2016 Rio Olympics - Team Fourth Place, Individual 20th Place
 2017 FEI World Cup Final - Sixth Place
 Glock's Zonik NOP - 2008 Dark Bay Danish Warmblood Stallion (Blue Hors Zack x Romanov)
 2018 FEI World Cup Final - Eighth Place

Personal life
Gal is in a long-term relationship with teammate Hans Peter Minderhoud. Gal has been interviewed in several Dutch media outlets about his relationship with Minderhoud.

References

1970 births
Living people
Dutch dressage riders
Gay sportsmen
LGBT equestrians
Dutch LGBT sportspeople
People from Rheden
Sportspeople from Gelderland
Equestrians at the 2012 Summer Olympics
Equestrians at the 2016 Summer Olympics
Equestrians at the 2020 Summer Olympics
Olympic equestrians of the Netherlands
Olympic bronze medalists for the Netherlands
Olympic medalists in equestrian
Medalists at the 2012 Summer Olympics
Dutch male equestrians
21st-century Dutch people